Sven Rydenfelt (23 January 1911 – 15 February 2005) was a Swedish economist and political writer known for his libertarian views.

Sven Rydenfelt was born in Hjärnarp, Ängelholm Municipality, Sweden. He became politically active during the 1940s when he started to write for several newspapers and journals. In 1945 he became the first chairman of the Liberal Student Association (affiliated with the social liberal People's Party) in Lund. Within the People's Party, Rydenfelt was considered as a rising young man and a possible candidate as Member of Parliament. However, due to a conflict with then party leader Bertil Ohlin over the party's stance on value added tax (which Rydenfelt opposed and Ohlin supported), Rydenfelt was forced to leave the party. During the 1950s he came to work for the Moderate Party instead. Among other things, he authored the party's program on housing policy. However, due to his strong support for the free market he was still considered too controversial by some.

Rydenfelt predicted already in 1956 the future collapse of the Soviet Union. In an article in the journal Samtid och Framtid (no.5/1956) he wrote: "Some argue that only a third world war could bring the Soviet Empire to an end. An inconsolable thought. If merely we have patience, it will crack from within, and through its gravel and ashes a new and more free Russia will rise".

In 1956, Rydenfelt was elected to the Mont Pelerin Society where he learned to know people like Friedrich Hayek and Milton Friedman who came to influence much of his political thinking. During the 1960s he continued his criticism of what he saw as the overregulated Swedish economy. In 1966 he authored the book Säkerhetspolisens hemliga register – om åsiktsfrihet och åsiktsförföljelse ("The Secret Registry of the Security Service – On Freedom of Opinion And Political Persecution") together with Janerik Larsson. This book led the Swedish Security Service to classify him as a "dangerous leftist activist".

It was first during the 1970s and 1980s that Rydenfelt's work and ideas was to be recognized in Sweden, and he became something of an icon among young Swedish conservatives and neoliberals. Due to his, for the Swedish political establishment, controversial opinions, he wasn't given a professorship until 1991, when the ministry of Carl Bildt took office. However, Rydenfelt continued to criticize both the Social Democrats as well as the non-socialist parties.

Towards the end of his life, Rydenfelt was a member of the editorial board of the journal Nyliberalen ("The Neoliberal"). He was also critical of the European Union and was an honorary member of Citizens Against EMU, the main non-socialist organization which campaigned against Sweden's adoption of the euro during the referendum in 2003.

Bibliography 
 
 
 
 
 
 
 
 
 
 (ed.) 
 
 
 
 
 
 
 
 
 
 
 
 
 
 
 
 
 
 
 
 
 
 
 
 

1911 births
2005 deaths
Swedish anti-communists
People from Ängelholm Municipality
Swedish economists
Swedish political writers
Swedish libertarians
20th-century Swedish journalists